Orseis is a genus of annelids belonging to the family Hesionidae.

The species of this genus are found in America.

Species:
 Orseis brevis Hartmann-Schröder, 1959 
 Orseis fimbriata Hartman, 1953

References

Annelids